Lorne Molleken (born June 11, 1956) is a Canadian former ice hockey goaltender and coach.  Molleken was head coach of the Chicago Blackhawks at the end of the 1999 and the beginning of the 2000 season.  He was nominally demoted to an assistant under Bob Pulford in December 1999, but Pulford allowed Molleken to continue making most of the on-ice decisions while serving largely as a senior consultant.

He is remembered primarily for receiving a black eye from Washington Capitals general manager George McPhee following an infamous September 25, 1999 preseason game in which, among other things, Capitals winger Trevor Halverson suffered a career-ending concussion. McPhee received thirty days' suspension and a fine from the league.

Career
Born in Regina, Saskatchewan, Molleken began his pro career with the Philadelphia Firebirds of the North American Hockey League in 1976–77.  He moved to the International Hockey League and tended goal for the Saginaw Gears and Toledo Goaldiggers, played in the Central Hockey League with the Indianapolis Checkers, and reached the American Hockey League with the Binghamton Dusters and, primarily, for the Springfield Indians.

He would also coach the Saskatoon Blades, Cape Breton Oilers, Hamilton Bulldogs, Regina Pats, and Chicago Blackhawks, and also serve as an assistant with the San Jose Sharks and Pittsburgh Penguins.

The Vancouver Giants announced on Tuesday, June 30 that Lorne Molleken has been named the sixth Head Coach in the club's history. On March 18, 2016, Molleken was fired as head coach of the Vancouver Giants.

Personal life
Molleken is the uncle of Major League Baseball player Dustin Molleken.

Coaching record

References

External links

1956 births
Living people
Binghamton Dusters players
Canadian expatriate ice hockey players in the United States
Canadian ice hockey coaches
Canadian ice hockey goaltenders
Chicago Blackhawks coaches
Ice hockey people from Saskatchewan
Indianapolis Checkers players
Lethbridge Broncos players
Philadelphia Firebirds (NAHL) players
Pittsburgh Penguins coaches
Regina Pats coaches
Saginaw Gears players
San Jose Sharks coaches
Saskatoon Blades coaches
Springfield Indians players
Sportspeople from Regina, Saskatchewan
Swift Current Broncos players
Toledo Goaldiggers players
Vancouver Giants coaches
Winnipeg Clubs players